Togbe Abutia Kodzo Gidi V (born 13 September 1981) is the 33rd Togbe of Abutia.

Life
Togbe Abutia Kodzo Gidi V was born in Abutia-Teti, Ghana.

He graduated leading schools in Ghana.

From 2004 to 2007, he studied Laws and Management at the Ho Polytechnic. Subsequently, he studied Economics and Finance at the University of Cape Coast and Paris.

On 1 September 1998, he was appointed as traditional ruler and Togbe of Abutia.

Engagement
Togbe Abutia Kodzo Gidi V has been committed to international understanding for many years and to the people of Abutia.

Awards
Selection of the most important orders and awards:
 Medal of Merit, Lions Club International

References

Living people
1981 births
Ghanaian royalty
University of Cape Coast alumni